Beretbinə is a village in the Balakan District of Azerbaijan. The village forms part of the municipality of Katekh.

References 

Populated places in Balakan District